Emon Ahmed (date of birth unknown) is a Bangladeshi cricketer. He made his debut in October 2008 for Dhaka Division. He played nine first-class matches from the 2008/09 season to the 2010/11 season, as well as a single Twenty20 match in the 2009/10 season and a List A match for Mohammedan Sporting Club in 2016.

References

External links 

Bangladeshi cricketers
Dhaka Division cricketers
Living people
Year of birth missing (living people)
South Asian Games gold medalists for Bangladesh
South Asian Games medalists in cricket